Lining may refer to:

 Lining (sewing), the process of inserting an inner layer of fabric, fur, or other material
 Lining of paintings,  the process of restoration paintings by attaching a new canvas to the back of the existing one
 Brake lining, consumable surfaces in brake systems
 Product lining, offering for sale several related products
 Roof lining, in an automobile roof
 Antonio Lining (born 1963), Filipino pool player
 Lining (steamboat), a method used by river boats to transit otherwise impassable falls and rapids
 Lining figures, a typeface whose numerals are all the same height
 Lining out, a form of a cappella hymn-singing

See also
 
 
 Li-Ning, Chinese sportswear company
 Li Ning (disambiguation)
 Line (disambiguation)